General Sir George Watkin Eben James Erskine  (23 August 1899 – 29 August 1965) was a British Army officer from Hascombe, Surrey. After he graduated from Royal Military College, Sandhurst, Erskine enlisted in the King's Royal Rifle Corps and saw action on the Western Front of World War I. During World War II, he commanded the 7th Armoured Division from 1943 to 1944. After World War II, Erksine commanded counterinsurgency operations against the Kenya Land and Freedom Army (KLFA) during the Mau Mau rebellion.

Early life and First World War
Erskine was the son of Major-General George Elphinstone Erskine by his second wife Eva Constance Sarah, daughter of Canon Ebenezer Wood Edwards. He was a descendant of the noted 18th-century jurist John Erskine of Carnock.

Erskine was educated at Charterhouse School and later entered the Royal Military College, Sandhurst and was commissioned as a second lieutenant into the King's Royal Rifle Corps (KRRC) in 1918. He served during World War I in France and Belgium and attended the Staff College, Camberley from 1929 to 1930. During the 1930s he served in India but returned to Britain in 1937 to become Deputy Assistant Quartermaster General at Eastern Command.

Second World War

In 1939 he became a General Staff Officer for 1st London Division of the Territorial Army (TA). In 1941 he was appointed Commanding Officer (CO) of the 2nd Battalion, KRRC, who were then part of the 69th Infantry Brigade and sent to North Africa, where he earned his Distinguished Service Order (DSO) in 1942. He served as Brigadier General Staff (BGS) of XIII Corps, commanded by William Gott, a fellow officer of the KRRC, then Brian Horrocks and Miles Dempsey in 1942. He was then promoted to acting major-general on 24 January 1943 and was appointed General Officer Commanding (GOC) 7th Armoured Division. He served with the division in North Africa, Italy and Normandy between 1943 and 1944.

During the Battle of Normandy in June and July 1944 the British Second Army commander, Lieutenant-General Miles Dempsey, was unimpressed with the performance of the 7th Armoured Division and the VIII Corps commander, Lieutenant-General Richard O'Connor, considered his direction of the division during Operation Goodwood excessively cautious. Shortly afterwards, in the difficult bocage country during Operation Bluecoat, the 7th Armoured Division failed to gain its objectives and Erskine was sacked and replaced by Gerald Lloyd-Verney. In spite of his indifferent performance as a field commander Erskine had qualities which suited him to other roles and this episode proved only a temporary setback to his career. He became Head of the Supreme Headquarters Allied Expeditionary Force Mission to Belgium in 1944 and then GOC 43rd (Wessex) Infantry Division in 1945.

Later career

After the war, Erskine was Commander of British Forces in Hong Kong in 1946, Director General of the Territorial Army 1948 to 1949 and GOC British Troops in Egypt in 1949. Returning to the United Kingdom, he became GOC-in-Chief, Eastern Command in 1952. In 1953 he was appointed GOC-in-Chief, East Africa Command where he had command of all security forces, including the colonial police. He was responsible for overseeing the response to the Mau Mau rebellion in Kenya, and led Operation Anvil in Nairobi in April 1954.

Upon taking command, Erskine issued an order that read: "I will not tolerate breaches of discipline leading to unfair treatment of anybody," and ordered that "every officer... should stamp on at once any conduct which he would be ashamed to see used against his own people." This did not stop Erskine from concealing incidents such as the Chuka massacre, though he also took steps to prosecute Major G.S.L. Griffiths, the officer responsible for the latter incident. Erskine was GOC-in-Chief, Southern Command from 1955 to 1958, when he retired.

In a letter to the British government, not made public until 2005, Erskine described his direct knowledge of atrocities committed by the security forces during the suppression of the uprising, including instances of torture and murder: "There is no doubt that in the early days... there was a great deal of indiscriminate shooting by army and police. I am quite certain prisoners were beaten to extract information. It is a short step from beating to torture and I'm now sure... that torture was a feature of many police posts." According to historian Fabian Klose, Erskine made extensive use of forced resettlement and mass internment to "break the back of the insurgency."

After retirement 
He was an Aide-de-Camp General to the Queen from 1955 to 1965.

Erskine was appointed Knight Commander of the Order of the British Empire (KBE) in 1950, a Knight Commander of the Order of the Bath (KCB) in 1952 and a Knight Grand Cross of the Order of the Bath (GCB) in 1955. From 1958 to 1963 he was Lieutenant Governor and Commander-in-Chief of Jersey.

Family
Erskine married Ruby de la Rue, daughter of Sir Evelyn de la Rue, 2nd Baronet, in 1930. They had two sons and one daughter.

References

References
 Anderson, David; Bennett, Huw; Branch, Daniel (August 2006). "A Very British Massacre". History Today. 56 (8): 20–22.

External links
Generals of World War II

|-
|-
 

|-

|-

|-

|-

|-

|-

1899 births
1965 deaths
British Army generals of World War II
British Army personnel of World War I
British people of the Mau Mau Uprising
Companions of the Distinguished Service Order
George
Governors of Jersey
Graduates of the Royal Military College, Sandhurst
Graduates of the Staff College, Camberley
King's Royal Rifle Corps officers
Knights Commander of the Order of the British Empire
Knights Grand Cross of the Order of the Bath
People educated at Charterhouse School
People from the Borough of Waverley
People from Horsham District
Military personnel from Surrey
Burials in Sussex
British Army generals